Photinus concisus is a species of firefly in the beetle family Lampyridae. It is found in Kerrville, Texas. It the species most closely related to Photinus pyralis.

References

Further reading

 
 
 

Lampyridae
Bioluminescent insects
Articles created by Qbugbot
Beetles described in 1968